Ashley-Anne Lilley is a Scottish actress and singer. She made her debut in the 2008 film Mamma Mia!.

Early life
Lilley was born in Rothesay, Bute. At the age of 12, she won a place with the National Youth Music Theatre. At 15, she enrolled at the Italia Conti Academy of Theatre Arts in London, and graduated in 2004.

Career
Lilley is primarily a stage actress, with a small number (five, starting with one episode of M.I. High in 2008 and ending with one episode of Lip Service in 2010) of film and television roles.  She starred as Lucille Frank in a production of Jason Robert Brown's Parade at the Edinburgh fringe festival in 2005. She then joined the UK tour of Cole Porter's Anything Goes in the role of Hope Harcourt. She made her film debut as Ali in 2008 in Mamma Mia!, appeared in the 11-minute short Cat Eats Dog (2009), and the romantic drama film Letters to Juliet (2010). She returned to theatre in 2011, starring in a new production, Nicked, at the HighTide festival.

Filmography

References

External links 
 

1986 births
Living people
People from Rothesay, Bute
British film actresses
National Youth Theatre members
Alumni of the Italia Conti Academy of Theatre Arts
People from the Isle of Bute
British musical theatre actresses
British child actresses